The 2013 Tour de Langkawi was the 18th edition of the Tour de Langkawi, a cycling stage race that took place in Malaysia. The LTdL 2013, which carries the slogan "Can You Feel The Heat?" and "The Heat is On!", was officially began on 21 February in Kangar and ended on 2 March in Kuala Terengganu.

The race was sanctioned by the Union Cycliste Internationale (UCI) as a 2.HC (hors category) race on the 2012–13 UCI Asia Tour calendar. The race was organised by the Ministry of Youth and Sports, via the National Sports Council (NSC) in association with the Malaysian National Cycling Federation (MNCF).

Julián Arredondo of Colombia won the overall race, 1' 15" clear of Dutch cyclist Pieter Weening and Sergio Pardilla of Spain was third overall. In the race's other classifications, Italian rider Francesco Chicchi won the blue jersey for points classification and Wang Meiyin of China won the red jersey for mountains classification and white jersey for Asian rider classification.  won the teams classification and  won the Asian teams classification.

Teams
22 teams accepted invitations to participate in the 2013 Tour de Langkawi. Five UCI ProTeams were invited to the race, along with six UCI Professional Continental and nine UCI Continental teams. The field was completed by two national selection teams.
UCI ProTour teams

 
 
 
 
 

UCI Professional Continental teams

 
 
 
 
 
 

UCI Continental teams

 Aisan Racing Team
 
 
 OCBC Singapore Continental Cycling Team
 
 
 
 
 

National teams

 Indonesia
 Malaysia

Stages
The race comprises 10 stages, covering 1469.7 kilometres.

Classification leadership

Final standings

General classification

Points classification

Mountains classification

Asian rider classification

Team classification

Asian team classification

Stage results

Stage 1
21 February 2014 — Kangar to Kulim,

Stage 2
28 February 2014 — Serdang to Kuala Kangsar,

Stage 3
23 February 2013 — Sungai Siput to Cameron Highlands,

Stage 4
24 February 2013 — Tapah to Kapar,

Stage 5
25 February 2013 — Proton, Shah Alam to Genting Highlands,

Stage 6 
26 February 2013 — Mentakab to Kuantan,

Stage 7
27 February 2013 — Kuantan to Dungun,

Stage 8 
28 February 2013 — Kuala Terengganu to Tanah Merah,

Stage 9
1 March 2013 — Pasir Puteh to Kuala Berang,

Stage 10 
2 March 2013 — Tasik Kenyir to Kuala Terengganu,

List of teams and riders
A total of 22 teams were invited to participate in the 2013 Tour de Langkawi. Out of the 132 riders, a total of 109 riders made it to the finish in Kuala Terengganu.

 
 Koldo Fernández
 Nathan Haas
 Raymond Kreder
 Caleb Fairly
 Peter Stetina
 Steele Von Hoff
 
 Andrea Guardini
 Alexsandr Dyachenko
 Assan Bazayev
 Alexey Lutsenko
 Andrey Kashechkin
 Ruslan Tleubayev
 
 Allan Davis
 Luke Durbridge
 Aidis Kruopis
 Travis Meyer
 Wesley Sulzberger
 Pieter Weening
 
 Theo Bos
 Graeme Brown
 Jetse Bol
 Tom Leezer
 Jos van Emden
 Marc Goos
 
 Bert Grabsch
 Andrew Fenn
 Michał Gołaś
 Serge Pauwels
 Pieter Serry
 Carlos Verona
 
 Francesco Chicchi
 Pierpaolo De Negri
 Stefano Borchi
 Michele Merlo
 Jonathan Monsalve
 Junya Sano

 
 Jacob Keough
 Aldo Ino Ilešič
 John Murphy
 Jeff Louder
 Jonathan Clarke
 Lucas Euser
 
 Adiq Husainie Othman
 Chad Beyer
 Chris Butler
 Gregor Gazvoda
 Craig Lewis
 Fabian Schnaidt
 
 Yukiya Arashiro
 Bryan Coquard
 Cyril Gautier
 Perrig Quémeneur
 Kévin Reza
 Pierre Rolland
 
 Tomás Gil
 Carlos José Ochoa
 Jackson Rodríguez
 Omar Bertazzo
 Patrick Facchini
 Diego Rosa
 
 Dennis Van Niekerk
 Jacques Janse van Rensburg
 Jani Tewelde
 Meron Russom
 Sergio Pardilla
 Tsgabu Grmay
 Synergy Baku Cycling Project
 Anuar Manan
 Rico Rogers
 Kirill Pozdnyakov
 Dan Craven
 John Ebsen
 Connor McConvey

 
 Ghader Mizbani
 Hossein Nateghi
 Mehdi Sohrabi
 Saeid Safarzadeh
 Alireza Asgharzadeh
 Amir Kolahdozhagh
 
 Ng Yong Li
 Jang Sun-jae
 Víctor Niño
 Vidal Celis Zabala
 Alex Destribois
 Óscar Pujol
 
 Harrif Salleh
 Zamri Salleh
 Umardi Rosdi
 Saiful Anuar Aziz
 Saufi Mat Senan
 Shahrul Mat Amin
 OCBC Singapore Continental Cycling Team
 Loh Sea Keong
 Josapheus Rabou
 Phuchong Sai-Udomsin
 Goh Choon Huat
 Ho Jun Rong
 Low Ji Wen
 
 Julián Arredondo
 Fortunato Baliani
 Shinichi Fukushima
 Manabu Ishibashi
 Mauro Abel Richeze
 Tanzou Tokuda

 Aisan Racing Team
 Takeaki Ayabo
 Taiji Nishitani
 Kazuhiro Mori
 Yasuharu Nakajima
 Shimpei Fukuda
 Masakazu Ito
 
 Park Sung-Baek
 Choi Seung-Woo
 Seo Joon-Yong
 Yeon Je-Sung
 Jung Ji-Min
 Kwon Soon-Yeong
 
 Wang Meiyin
 Li Fuyu
 Xing Fu
 Liu Yilin
 Liu Jianpeng
 Wang Bo
 Malaysia
 Lutfi Md Fauzan
 Amir Mustafa Rusli
 Rauf Nur Misbah
 Mohd Nur Rizuan Zainal
 Afif Ahmad Zamri
 Yusrizal Usoff
 Indonesia
 Aiman Cahyadi
 Dadi Suryadi
 Hari Fitrianto
 Endra Wijaya
 Robin Manulang
 Fatahillah Abdullah

References

External links

2013 Tour de Langkawi at cyclingnews.com

Tour de Langkawi
Tour de Langkawi
Tour de Langkawi